This is a list of films which have placed number one at the weekend box office in Brazil during 2009 (amounts are in Brazilian reais; 1 real is approximately equivalent to 0.64 US dollars).

See also
List of Brazilian films — Brazilian films by year

References
Filme B
E-Pipoca

Brazil
2009
2009 in Brazil